In topology, a branch of mathematics, a topological monoid is a monoid object in the category of topological spaces. In other words, it is a monoid with a topology with respect to which the monoid's binary operation is continuous. Every topological group is a topological monoid.

See also 
H-space

References

External links 
topological monoid from symmetric monoidal category

Topological spaces
Algebraic topology